Bents railway station served the village of Bents, West Lothian, Scotland, from 1865 to 1955 on the Longridge and Bathgate Extension Railway.

History 
The station was opened in February 1865 by the Edinburgh and Glasgow Railway. It had originally opened as a goods only station. The goods yard and a station building was to the south and on the platform was a stone building. The station closed to passengers on 1 May 1930 and closed to goods on 2 May 1955.

References

External links 

Disused railway stations in West Lothian
Railway stations in Great Britain opened in 1865
Railway stations in Great Britain closed in 1930
1865 establishments in Scotland
1955 disestablishments in Scotland
Former North British Railway stations